Best I Can may refer to:

 "Best I Can" (Rush song)
 "Best I Can" (Queensrÿche song), 1990